Sulzdorf an der Lederhecke is a municipality in the district of Rhön-Grabfeld in Bavaria in Germany.  The Gemeinde is composed of six villages: (Obereßfeld, Schwanhausen, Serrfeld, Sternberg im Grabfeld, Sulzdorf an der Lederhecke, Zimmerau) and four hamlets: Brennhausen, Heckenmühle, Serrfeldermühle, Sulzdorfermühle.

References

Bibliography
Reinhold Albert, 1994: Chronik der Gemeinde Sulzdorf an der Lederhecke (2 Volumes, in 860 pages) published by the Gemeinde Sulzdorf a. d. L., Verlag Frankenschwelle (Hildburghausen) 1994.

Rhön-Grabfeld